Dwight D. Eisenhower (1890–1969) was the president of the United States from 1953 to 1961.

Eisenhower may also refer to:

 Eisenhower (surname)
 the Eisenhower Doctrine 
 the Eisenhower box, a Time Management strategy
 Eisenhower (album), the music album by The Slip